26th ADG Awards
March 5, 2022

Period Film:
Nightmare Alley

Fantasy Film:
Dune

Contemporary Film:
No Time to Die

The 26th Art Directors Guild Excellence in Production Design Awards, honoring the best production designers in film, television and media of 2021, is set to be held on March 5, 2022, at the InterContinental Hotel in Los Angeles, California, United States. The nominations were announced on January 24, 2022.

Denis Villeneuve will be awarded with the William Cameron Menzies Award, while Jane Campion will receive the Cinematic Imagery Award.

Winners and nominees

Film

Television

Short form

William Cameron Menzies Award
Denis Villeneuve

Cinematic Imagery Award
Jane Campion

References

Art Directors Guild Awards
2021 film awards
2021 in American cinema